Show Your Bones is the second studio album by American indie rock band Yeah Yeah Yeahs, released on March 28, 2006 by Interscope Records. The album was nominated for a Grammy Award for Best Alternative Music Album in 2007.

Background and music
In early 2005, the band decided to scrap all of the songs they had written for the record so far and re-invent their style. Karen O said, "We're not interested in making Fever to Tell Part 2. The pressure is to re-invent ourselves. We don't know how we're going to do it yet but I think it's in our best interests to try and explore other directions." Guitarist Nick Zinner added, "It seems like a necessary step and the obvious thing to do is not repeat what you've played. I was disappointed by a lot of band's second records recently over the past year or two because it sounded like B-sides from the first record."

In an interview with Blender magazine, the band said during the writing and recording that they had almost broken up, calling that time one of their "darkest" moments.

In December 2005, producer Squeak E. Clean told MTV News that the band's second album would be a concept album about lead singer Karen O's cat, to be titled Coco Beware, but this turned out to be untrue.

Spin described the sound on the album as a "more melodic" alternative rock, recalling Pixies, Belly and Siouxsie Sioux.

Critical reception

Show Your Bones received generally positive reviews from music critics. At Metacritic, which assigns a weighted mean rating out of 100 to reviews from mainstream critics, the album received an average score of 79, based on 35 reviews, which indicates "generally favorable reviews".

Most reviews were positive: E! Online gave the album an A− and said, "The group cuts through style in pursuit of substance, using Fever to Tell's slow-burning hit 'Maps' as a jump-off point." The Village Voice gave it a positive review and said it wasn't "the Yeahs' Room on Fire.  Far from it." Los Angeles Times gave the album three-and-a-half stars out of four and called it "minimalist rock with real feeling and a subversive, epic range." The A.V. Club gave it a B+ and said, "As before, the band's willingness to ground itself in human emotion sets it apart." Playlouder gave it a score of four stars out of five and said: "If 'Fever To Tell' was a scratchy post punk effort, then this is their gothic record." Alternative Press also gave it four stars out of five and called it "the sort of second album that, rather than being a sophomore slump, makes you anxiously wonder what albums three, four and five will sound like." musicOMH likewise gave the album four stars out of five and called it "the sound of a bang irretrievably, irresistibly and deservedly hurtling towards the big time." BBC Collective likewise gave it four stars out of five and simply said: "Short answer: it's good."

Yahoo! Music UK gave it a score of seven stars out of ten and called it "flawed, but applause for adding vulnerability to [the band's] game plan, at the very least." Under the Radar also gave it seven stars out of ten and called it "a bit top-heavy" but "nonetheless rewarding". Prefix Magazine also gave it a positive review and called it "much more accessible than its predecessor, but there isn't really a 'Maps' to serve as a gateway."

Other reviews are very average or mixed: Blender gave the album a score of three stars out of five and said of the band: "They're after something different here--it's just not as good as what they've left behind." Paste gave it a score of six out of ten and said that it was "replaced by a more temperate jangle". Now gave it three stars out of five and said, "It's time to move some units, so quirky's out and tunefulness is in." Billboard gave it an average review and said that "Much of the material... is more intimate and, at times, tentative." The New York Times also gave it an average review and said it "doesn't confide much, but it's a picture of a band that's not quite sure what to do next." The Guardian gave it two stars out of five and said that "despite finding some hooks worth pilfering, the band are still struggling to raise their game beyond White Stripes-goth-lite." The Austin Chronicle also gave it two stars out of five and said, "Gone is the glitzy art-punk, spastic freak-out, and unfathomable screaming. Here now instead is simple melody, nasal singing, and familiar songs."

Accolades
The album was nominated for Best Alternative Music Album at the 2007 Grammy Awards. In December 2006, the album was named the second best album of the year by NME magazine, as well as "Cheated Hearts" being voted the tenth best song. Rolling Stone magazine named it the forty-fourth best album of 2006, while Spin magazine ranked it number thirty-one on their list of the forty best albums of 2006. In 2009, Rhapsody ranked it number ten on the "Alt/Indie's Best Albums of the Decade" list. NME ranked it number thirty-two on their Top 100 Albums of the Decade list.

Commercial performance
Show Your Bones debuted at number eleven on the US Billboard 200 with 56,000 copies sold in its first week. In the United Kingdom, the album had sold 112,819 copies by March 2009, and was certified gold by the British Phonographic Industry (BPI) on July 22, 2013. As of 2009, sales in the United States have reached 269,000 copies, according to Nielsen SoundScan.

Track listing

Personnel
Credits adapted from the liner notes of Show Your Bones.

Yeah Yeah Yeahs
 Yeah Yeah Yeahs – production
 Brian Chase – drums, percussion, guitar
 Karen O – lead vocals, omnichord, piano ; mixing 
 Nick Zinner – guitar, mixing, keyboards

Additional personnel

 Squeak E. Clean – engineering, handclap chorus, production
 Chris Coady – engineering, handclap chorus
 Jamie Daughters – photography
 Brooke Gillespie – handclap chorus, studio assistant
 Julian Gross – art direction, cover
 Alan "Ringo" Labiner – assistant engineering, handclap chorus
 Roger Lian – sequencing
 Marshmellow – concept
 Money Mark – keyboards 
 Alan Moulder – mixing
 Peter Najera – assistant engineering
 Chris Rakestraw – assistant engineering
 Andrew Savours – assistant engineering
 David Andrew Sitek – additional production ; MPC sampler 
 Howie Weinberg – mastering

Charts

Weekly charts

Year-end charts

Release history

References

2006 albums
Albums produced by Dave Sitek
Fiction Records albums
Interscope Records albums
Polydor Records albums
Yeah Yeah Yeahs albums